Jacques Alexandre Bixio (20 November 1808 – 16 December 1865) was a French doctor, balloonist, and politician of Italian origin.

Bxio was born in Chiavari, Italy, and published a number of works relating to agriculture. He was the first minister of agriculture and commerce for Napoleon III of France, but is better remember as a scientific balloonist.

On 29 June 1850, at 10.27 A.M., Bixio and Jean Augustin Barral made the first of two balloon ascents from the Paris Observatory in a balloon inflated with hydrogen. The first turned out poorly. MM. Bixio and Barral determined to ascend again and on 27 July 1850, they repeated the experiment. The ascent was remarkable on account of the extreme cold at the elevation attained. Bixio died in Paris on 16 December 1865.

References 
 1902 encyclopedia entry
 William Butcher, Arthur C. (FRW) Clarke, Jules Verne, Thunder's Mouth Press, 2006, page 145. .

1808 births
1865 deaths
People from Chiavari
French people of Italian descent
Moderate Republicans (France)
French Ministers of Agriculture and Commerce
Members of the 1848 Constituent Assembly
Members of the National Legislative Assembly of the French Second Republic
French balloonists